The 68th Women's Boat Race took place on 24 March 2013.  The race, between crews representing Oxford University Women's Boat Club and Cambridge University Women's Boat Club, was conducted as part of the Henley Boat Races.  It took place on a  stretch of water on 2012 Olympic venue Dorney Lake.  Cambridge were the heavier of the crews and consisted of an all-British crew, while Oxford's boat included a Hungarian rower and an American cox.  Oxford won the race by one and three-quarter lengths in a time of 7 minutes 11 seconds, their first win since the 2011 race.  The victory took the overall record in the event to 41–27 in Cambridge's favour.

Background

The Women's Boat Race is a side-by-side rowing competition between Oxford University Women's Boat Club (OUWBC) and the Cambridge University Women's Boat Club (CUWBC) that has taken place since 1927.  It was conducted as part of the Henley Boat Races, which for 2013 was hosted at the 2012 Summer Olympics venue of Dorney Lake in Buckinghamshire instead of the traditional straight course at Henley-on-Thames.  Strong winds and stream conditions on the River Thames had precipitated the move to the Olympic venue.  Cambridge went into the race as champions, having won the previous year's race by one quarter of a length, and led 41–26 overall.  The race was sponsored by Newton Investment Management, a subsidiary of The Bank of New York Mellon, for the third successive year.

Cambridge were led by Rob Baker who had previously coached Goldie to victory in 2006 and 2007.  Baker was assisted by British Olympic quadruple sculls silver medallist Annie Vernon.  Oxford's coach was Canadian former Olympic and University trainer Christine Wilson.  She was assisted by British Olympic rower Natasha Page who was part of the women's eights that came fifth in both the 2008 and 2012 Summer Olympics.

Crews
Trials for the crews were held in December 2012. Oxford's trial boats raced at Henley and were named Quick and Easy while Cambridge's trials took place at Dorney Lake with boats named Gin and Tonic.

The weigh-in, held on 4 March 2013, took place alongside the men for the first time in the history of the event.  It was also the first time the weights of the female crews were made public.  The Cambridge crew weighed an average of 11 st 0 lb 10 oz (70.0 kg), 4 lb 3 oz (1.9 kg) per rower more than their opponents.  Oxford saw two rowers return to the crew in number three Mary Foord-Weston and number six Harriet Keane, both of whom had participated in the 2012 race.  Oxford's boat club president Bridget Fryer was forced to withdraw from the race through injury.  Cambridge's crew included three rowers with Boat Race experience, in bow Caroline Reid, number two Faye Sandford (who was earning her third Blue for CUWBC) and stroke Holly Game.  Cambridge's boat club president Helena Schofield did not participate in the event, and instead rowed for the women's reserve boat Blondie.

CUWBC's cox Esther Momcilovic had previously steered the Cambridge reserve boat Blondie, while Oxford's crew included three former Osiris participants in Amy Varney, Keane and cox Katie Apfelbaum.  Cambridge's crew was entirely British while Oxford's included Hungarian Mariann Novak at bow, British/Germans Alice Carrington-Windo at two and Maxie Scheske at stroke, and American Apfelbaum.

Race
Cambridge won the toss and selected the more sheltered side of the course.  The race started at 3:00 p.m. on 24 March 2013.  Cambridge made the quicker start and led by a few feet after ten strokes.  They were half a length ahead after , out-rating Oxford by fours strokes per minute.  OUWBC's longer strokes enabled them to cope with the "choppy" conditions and at the  mark they began to catch the Cambridge boat, getting level by the  mark.  Pushing on, Oxford pulled away to win by one and three-quarter lengths in a time of 7 minutes 11 seconds, the slowest winning time since the 2001 race.  It was Oxford's first win since the 2011 race but their fifth win in the last six events.  The victory took the overall record in the event to 41–27 in Cambridge's favour.

Oxford's Foord-Weston said the conditions were "pretty grim" but their training at Dorney during the week running up to the race had prepared them for the "horrible winds".  Cambridge's number seven, Emily Day, said "it was pretty windy ... we had the race of our lives ... there's nothing we could have done that we didn't do."

See also
The Boat Race 2013

References

External links
Official website
Video of the race

Women's Boat Race
Boat
Women's Boat Race
Women's Boat Race
Boat Race
2013 sports events in London